Dakabin railway station is located on the North Coast line in Queensland, Australia. It serves the suburbs of Dakabin and Kurwongbah in the Moreton Bay Region.

Services
Dakabin station is served by all City network services from Nambour and Caboolture to Central, many continuing to Springfield Central, Ipswich and Rosewood.

Services by platform

References

External links

Dakabin station Queensland Rail
Dakabin station Queensland's Railways on the Internet
Dakabin Station Action Group

Railway stations in Moreton Bay Region
Shire of Pine Rivers
North Coast railway line, Queensland